Product Hunt is an American website to share and discover new products. It was founded by Ryan Hoover in November 2013.

Users submit products, which are listed in a linear format by day. The site includes a comments system and a voting system similar to Hacker News or Reddit. The products with the most votes rise to the top of each day's list.

Products are organized into four categories; technology products (web apps, mobile apps, hardware products, etc.), games (PC, web, mobile apps), books and podcasts. A submission simply requires a product title, URL, and tagline. As of 2016, according to Hoover, the website has led to the discovery of over 100 million products across 50,000 companies.

The site also includes a daily email list that sends out yesterday's top tech "hunts" (products) as well as a featured collection. A version of the digest is also available for games and books.

Product Hunt is also available as an iOS app, macOS app, an Android app, and Google Chrome extension. The company's headquarters is in San Francisco.

The site received funding from Y Combinator.

History

2013
Product Hunt launched on November 6, 2013, when it began as an email list built using Linkydink. The first version of the website was developed by Nathan Bashaw and Ryan Hoover over the Thanksgiving break in 2013. On July 17, 2014, the company announced its Y Combinator backing.

2014
In Fall 2014, the company announced it would receive $6.1 million in Series A funding led by Andreessen Horowitz.

2015
On February 5, 2015, the company won the "best new startup" of 2014 Crunchie award.

In September 2015, the company added a podcast section to the site. However, in 2016, they put an end to it, stating that it would "distract from our main mission" of surfacing great products.

In December 2015, the company launched an iPhone app. In September 2017, it launched "Ship", which is a suite of tools for makers to generate demand for the products they create.

2016
In November 2016, AngelList acquired Product Hunt for $20 million.

2018
In February 2018, Product Hunt released a new tech news aggregator app called "Sip." Sip was shut down in 2019.

2019
In July 2019, the company launched "Launch Day" to help users monitor their entire launch in real time.

2020
In October 2020, the company announced Josh Buckley, angel investor and founder of Mino Games, as its new CEO.

2021
In August 2021, the company announced Ashley Higgins, former GM, as its new CEO.

References

External links
 

Social bookmarking websites
Remote companies
Companies based in San Francisco
Internet properties established in 2013
Y Combinator companies
IOS software
Google Chrome extensions
American companies established in 2013
2013 establishments in California
2016 mergers and acquisitions